Drew Cheshire (born 6 September 1991) is an English professional rugby union player who plays for Moseley. A product of Gloucester academy. He signed his first professional contract with Moseley who compete in the RFU Championship.  Prior to joining Moseley, Drew spent a number of seasons with Luctonians experiencing first team rugby in both National League 3 Midlands and National League 2 North.

Honours

North Midlands
County Championship Plate runners up: 2013

References

1991 births
Living people
English rugby union players
Gloucester Rugby players
Rugby union players from Hereford
Rugby union wings